Hureae is a tribe of plant of the family Euphorbiaceae. It comprises 4 genera.

See also
 Taxonomy of the Euphorbiaceae

References

Euphorbioideae
Euphorbiaceae tribes